Galván, Dominican Republic is a town in the Baoruco province of the Dominican Republic.

Sources 
World Gazeteer: Dominican Republic – World-Gazetteer.com

Populated places in Baoruco Province
Municipalities of the Dominican Republic